Nightstick is an American sludge metal band from Weymouth, Massachusetts. The band was formed by -Siege drummer Rob Williams.

Nightstick is well known for their unique stage shows which feature a dancing clown called Padoinka. Padoinka the clown is widely considered to be the fourth member of the band and has featured heavily on the art work of all three full-length albums. Nightstick was given the key to the city of Weymouth by the mayor Sue Kay.

Line-up
 Alex Smith – Vocals/Bass
 Cotie Cowgill – Guitars
 Rob Williams – Drums

Former members
 Bobby Clark – guitar
 Chris Joyce - Padoinka The Clown

Discography
 In Dahmer's Room (1994, Devour Records)
 Blotter (1996, Relapse Records)
 Ultimatum (1998, Relapse Records)
 Death to Music (1999, Relapse Records)
 Rock + Roll Weymouth (2012, At War With False Noise)

References

Heavy metal musical groups from Massachusetts
American sludge metal musical groups